Miri Rubin (born 1956) is a historian and Professor of Medieval and Early Modern History at Queen Mary University of London. She was educated at the Hebrew University of Jerusalem and the University of Cambridge, where she gained her doctorate and was later awarded a research fellowship and a post-doctoral research fellowship at Girton College. Rubin studies the social and religious history of Europe between 1100 and 1500, concentrating on the interactions between public rituals, power, and community life.

In 2012 she gave a Turku Agora Lecture. In 2017 she gave the Wiles Lectures at Queen's University Belfast.

Her books have been well received in newspapers and academic journals. The Guardian calls her Hollow Crown "a magnificent history of the late Middle Ages". The TLS reviews her Cities of Strangers as a "thoughtful and pioneering book".

Bibliography

Corpus Christi: The Eucharist in Late Medieval Culture (Cambridge: Cambridge University Press, 1991), 
Church and City, 1000-1500: Essays in Honour of Christopher Brooke (Cambridge: Cambridge University Press, 1992), ed. with David Abulafia and Michael Franklin
Framing Medieval Bodies (Manchester: Manchester University Press, 1994), ed. with Sarah Kay
The Work of Jacques Le Goff and the Challenges of Medieval History (Woodbridge: Boydell Press, 1997), 
Gentile Tales: The Narrative Assault on Late Medieval Jews (New Haven: Yale University Press, 1999), 
The Hollow Crown: A History of Britain in the Late Middle Ages (London: Allen Lane, 2005), 
Love, Friendship and Faith in Europe, 1300-1800 (Houndmills: Palgrave Macmillan, 2005), ed. with Laura Gowing and Michael Hunter
Mother of God: A History of the Virgin Mary (Allen Lane, 2009), 
The Middle Ages: A Very Short Introduction (Oxford: Oxford University Press, 2014).
Thomas of Monmouth, The Life and Passion of William of Norwich, (London: Penguin, 2014), trans. with an introduction Miri Rubin
Cities of Strangers: Making Lives in Medieval Europe (Cambridge: Cambridge University Press, 2020),

Notes

1956 births
Academics of Queen Mary University of London
Alumni of Girton College, Cambridge
British medievalists
Women medievalists
Hebrew University of Jerusalem alumni
Living people
Corresponding Fellows of the Medieval Academy of America
British women historians
20th-century British historians
20th-century British women writers
21st-century British historians
21st-century British women writers